Un dramma borghese (internationally released as Mimi) is a 1979 Italian drama film directed by Florestano Vancini. It is based on the novel with the same title by Guido Morselli  and it has as main theme an incestuous love between a father and a daughter.

Cast 
 Franco Nero: Guido
 Dalila Di Lazzaro: Therese
 Lara Wendel: Mimmina
 Carlo Bagno: Dr. Vanetti

References

External links

Un dramma borghese at Variety Distribution

1979 films
Italian drama films
Films directed by Florestano Vancini
Incest in film
Films scored by Riz Ortolani
1970s Italian-language films
1970s Italian films